Tommy Harrison (born 22 January 1974) is a Scottish footballer, who played for Heart of Midlothian, Dunfermline Athletic, Clyde, York City, Carlisle United, Berwick Rangers, East Fife and Montrose.

References

External links

1974 births
Living people
Association football midfielders
Scottish footballers
Heart of Midlothian F.C. players
Dunfermline Athletic F.C. players
Clyde F.C. players
York City F.C. players
Carlisle United F.C. players
Berwick Rangers F.C. players
East Fife F.C. players
Montrose F.C. players
Scottish Football League players
English Football League players
Footballers from Edinburgh
Scotland youth international footballers